Perkedel are vegetable fritters from Indonesian cuisine. Most common perkedel are made from mashed potatoes, yet there are other popular variants which includes perkedel jagung (peeled maize perkedel) and perkedel tahu (tofu perkedel) and perkedel ikan (minced fish). Throughout most of Indonesia it is called perkedel; however, it is called begedil in Javanese, and also called that way in Malaysia and Singapore, which could suggest that this fried food was introduced by Javanese immigrants to Malaysia and Singapore.

Origin
Perkedel is believed to be derived from Dutch frikadeller, which is actually a Danish meatball or minced meat dish. This was owed to Indonesian historical and colonial link to the Netherlands. Unlike frikadeller, the perkedel's main ingredient is not meat, but mashed potato.

Ingredients
Prior to mashing, the potato slices, however, are not boiled as that can cause the perkedel to be too mushy, but deep fried or baked instead. The mashed fried potato is mixed, as much as 1:1 ratio, with ground meat or corned beef. However, sometimes common perkedel contains less or no meat at all. The mixture is then mixed with chopped scallion and seasoned with white pepper powder, then shaped into flat round patties and dipped in egg yolk or beaten egg, before being deep fried.

Other than mashed potato, cabe rawit, spring onion, shrimp, peeled corn, or mashed tofu fritters are also common as perkedel ingredients.

Serving
Perkedel is a popular dish, either for a side dish or an appetizer. In Indonesia, it is usually served with nasi kuning as part of tumpeng, soto ayam chicken soup to common sayur sop (vegetable-chicken soup).

See also

 Frikadeller
 Bitterballen
 Gorengan

References

External links
 

Indonesian cuisine
Fritters
Dishes featuring sweet corn
Appetizers
Potato dishes
Tofu dishes